"Jerusalem of Gold" (Yerushalayim Shel Zahav) is an Israeli song written by Naomi Shemer. Often contrasted with the official anthem Hatikva, the original song described the Jewish people's 2,000-year longing to return to Jerusalem. Shemer added a final verse after the Six-Day War to celebrate Jerusalem's re-unification.

History
Naomi Shemer wrote the original song for the Israeli Song Festival (it was not in competition but had been commissioned by the Mayor of Jerusalem, Teddy Kollek), held on 15 May 1967, the night after Israel's nineteenth Independence Day. She chose the then-unknown Shuli Nathan to sing the song.

The melody is largely based on a Basque lullaby, Pello Joxepe (Pello or 'Peyo' is a typical Basque name), composed by Juan Francisco Petriarena 'Xenpelar' (1835–1869). Shemer heard a rendition by singer/songwriter Paco Ibáñez, who visited Israel in 1962 and performed the song to a group that included Shemer and Nehama Hendel. She later acknowledged hearing Hendel perform Pello Joxepe in the mid-1960s, and that she had unconsciously based some of the melody on the lullaby. Shemer felt very bad about the similararity of her song to Pello Joxepe, but when Ibáñez was asked how he felt about the issue, he replied he was "glad it helped in some way", and that he was not angry, nor did he perceive it as plagiarism.

At that time, the Old City was still controlled by the Hashemite Kingdom of Jordan and under its occupying rule. Jews had been banned from the Old City and the rest of East Jerusalem, losing their homes and possessions and becoming refugees. All Jews were barred from either returning or entering the areas under Jordanian control, and many holy sites were desecrated and damaged during that period. Only three weeks after the song was published, the Six-Day War broke out, and the song became a morale-boosting battle anthem of the Israel Defense Forces. Shemer herself sang it for the troops before the war and the festival, making them among the first in the world to hear it.

On 7 June 1967, the IDF took eastern Jerusalem and the Old City from the Jordanians. Shemer was about to perform for a troop of paratroopers (who were not engaged in combat at the moment) when she heard that the Western Wall and Temple Mount were “in our hands” (the Israeli army). Instead of simply announcing this to the troop, she quickly penned a new verse which modified the second verse. The line about the shofar sounding from the Temple Mount is a reference to army chaplain Rabbi Shlomo Goren’s sounding the shofar immediately after capture of the Western Wall. Shemer later stated that she did not intend for this new verse to replace the second verse, and that the original three verses should remain the official song.

Themes
Many of the lyrics refer to traditional Jewish poetry and themes, particularly dealing with exile and longing for Jerusalem. "Jerusalem of Gold" is a reference to a special piece of jewelry mentioned in a famous Talmudic legend about Rabbi Akiva; "To all your songs, I am a lyre" is a reference "Zion ha-lo Tish'ali", one of the "Songs to Zion" by Rabbi Yehuda Halevi: "I cry out like the jackals when I think of their grief; but, dreaming of the end of their captivity, I am like a harp for your songs.

The poem is woven with mournful Biblical references to the destruction of Jerusalem and subsequent exile of the Jewish people. איכה (the lament "How?") is the first word of the Book of Lamentations and its traditional Hebrew title; the next two words, "the city that sits solitary," appear in the second stanza. "If I forget thee Jerusalem" is a quote from Psalm 137, i.e. "By the rivers of Babylon, there we sat down and wept, when we remembered Zion." This contrasts with the joyous return from exile in the fourth verse. "Like the kiss of a Seraph" is a reference to Isaiah 6:7.

Talmudic references, too, are present. "[A]nd to adorn crowns to you" uses the Talmudic concept of adorning crowns, used by the Talmud to describe the a few things, including Sandalphon's service to God.

Other versions
Many artists have recorded their own versions of the song.
 Queen Ofir Israeli/American Creator and Internationally known performer recorded a modern version of the song for the celebration of Jerusalem Day 2020. 
 Daliah Lavi Israeli actress and singer performed the song in 1969 on the UK record "In honour of the 20th anniversary of the birth of the state of Israel" with the London Festival Orchestra, conducted by Stanley Black.
 The late Israeli singer Ofra Haza sang one of the most popular versions of the song at Pa'amonei HaYovel (Bells of the Jubilee), Israel's 50th Anniversary celebration in 1998.
 The song appears in the 1991 film Pour Sacha, about the Six-Day War.
 The recording from Pour Sacha was reused two years later, in 1993, over the final sequence of the film Schindler's List. 
 The Schindler's List soundtrack album featured an alternate recording, performed by The Ramat Gan Chamber Choir Tel Aviv, conducted by Hana Tzur.
 Klaus Meine, vocalist of the popular rock band Scorpions, recorded a cover of the song together with Israeli Liel Kolet.
 The Greek singer Demis Roussos recorded a version of the song as well, though he changed the verse melody considerably.
 The jam band Phish also performs the song on tour and recorded a rendition of the song on the 1994 album "Hoist".
 Brazilian singer-songwriter Roberto Carlos covered the Portuguese version of the song in 2011, and even sang a verse and the chorus in the original Hebrew.
 French singer-songwriter Hélène Ségara covered the French version of the song, in the album "Mon Pays C'est La Terre" released in 2008, with the verse and the chorus in the original Hebrew.
 Tamar Giladi, Naomi Shemer's daughter-in-law, recorded the song with mixed Hebrew and English lyrics.
 American Belz Hasidic singer Shulem Lemmer covered the song, in his album The Perfect Dream, released in 2019. 
 Finnish singer Carola Standertskjöld performed a version written by Sauvo Puhtila, in a 1968 recording.

The song has been translated loosely into many languages. It was chosen as the "Song of the Year" in Israel in 1967 and "Song of the Jubilee" in Israel's 50th Independence Day in 1998.

The song is the corps song of the La Crosse, Wisconsin Blue Stars Drum and Bugle Corps. The corps sings it before every competition.

Controversy
The song is featured in the 1993 American film Schindler's List and plays near the end of the film. This caused some controversy in Israel, as the song (which was written in 1967) is widely considered an informal anthem of the Israeli victory in the Six-Day War and has no relationship with the subject matter of the movie. In Israeli prints of the film, the song was replaced with Halikha LeKesariya (lit. "A Walk to Caesarea"), which is universally associated with the Holocaust in Israel and was written by World War II resistance fighter Hannah Szenes in 1942.

References

External links
 
 
 
 
 Jerusalem of Gold
  Paco Ibáñez – Pello Joxepe

1967 songs
1967 in Israel
Israeli songs
Israeli patriotic songs
Culture of Jerusalem
Songs about Jerusalem
Songs about Israel
Six-Day War
Music based on the Bible